Portlandia is a genus of marine bivalve mollusks in the family Yoldiidae. They can be found in all the oceans. The genus includes Portlandia arctica, the bivalve which gave its name – when it was still known as Yoldia arctica – to the Yoldia Sea.

Species
There are six recognized species:

References

Yoldiidae
Bivalve genera
Taxa named by Otto Andreas Lowson Mörch